XHTDMX-TDT is a television station in Mexico City, an owned-and-operated station of the Monterrey-based Multimedios Televisión network. Owned by Grupo Multimedios through the subsidiary company Televisión Digital, S.A. de C.V., it broadcasts on physical channel 11 and virtual channel 6 from the Canal Once tower on Cerro del Chiquihuite.

History
XHTDMX was awarded in the IFT-6 television station auction of 2017. Multimedios paid Mex$425,929,000 for the concession.

The station began testing on 12 April 2018, making it the first of the six Multimedios stations won in the auction to broadcast, and activated its second and third subchannels on 4 July. Multimedios programming officially launched programming on the main signal the night of 14 August 2018 with the launch of the second season of the network's inter-network dance competition program, Bailadísimo, and began to have the full network programming schedule on-air as of 27 August.

Multimedios is building studio facilities in Mexico City in the former home of the Novedades newspaper to begin local program production in the capital (including a local branch of Multimedios' Telediario news division); the network had previously used a small bureau to cover national news events in the capital. The American cable/satellite version of Multimedios carries the noon-1 p.m. and 7 p.m.-8 p.m. segments of XHTDMX's Telediario broadcasts, along with Futbol al Dia and Multimedios Deportes. The network's Thursday night interview series SNSerio also has begun to originate most weeks from XHTDMX's studios to take advantage of a larger possible guest pool.

Digital subchannels 
The station's digital channel is multiplexed:

The 6.2 and 6.3 subchannels use MPEG-4 compression.

The 6.4 subchannel, authorized to carry the MVS TV channel from MVS Comunicaciones, launched on November 5, 2018. In 2019, it was changed to MPEG-2 compression.

Repeater 

XHTDMX-TDT has two operating repeaters. One is on RF channel 12 at Tultepec, State of Mexico, broadcasting with 7 kW ERP. Another, on channel 11, was authorized for Valle de Chalco Solidaridad, also with 7 kW ERP, in August 2019.

References 

2018 establishments in Mexico
Television channels and stations established in 2018
Television stations in Mexico City
Canal 6 (Mexico)